Encantado is a municipality in the state of Rio Grande do Sul, Brazil. It is located 25km northeast of Teutônia. It is also the location of the Christ the Protector statue, which was completed in 2022.

Neighboring municipalities include Muçum, Roca Sales, and Vespasiano Corrêa.

See also
List of municipalities in Rio Grande do Sul

References

Municipalities in Rio Grande do Sul